Guala Bicchieri ( 1150 – 1227) was an Italian diplomat, papal official and cardinal. He was the papal legate in England from 1216 to 1218, and took a prominent role in the politics of England during King John’s last years and Henry III’s early minority.

Guala Bicchieri arrived in England in the midst of the baronial rebellion, when rebel barons were attempting to force John from the throne and when the suspension and exile of archbishop Stephen Langton had left the English church without a leader. Bicchieri was a supporter of King John in the struggle against the barons and their candidate for the English crown, Louis of France. As the Pope’s nuncio, Guala Bicchieri played an important role in stabilizing the English church in the aftermath of this civil war now known as the First Barons’ War. He was instrumental in the reissuing of Magna Carta.

Guala Bicchieri was from a prominent family in Vercelli in northern Italy, in what is now the Italian region of Piedmont; his father, Manfredo de Bicheriis, was a consul of the city.
He was trained for the law but entered the clergy; he is first mentioned in 1187 as a canon in the cathedral of Vercelli. By 1205 he had become a cardinal and had served as a papal legate in northern Italy before being appointed legate to France in 1208. Pope Innocent III named him legate to England in January 1216. His mission was to make peace between the English and the French; the civil war and the threatened invasion by the French—in support of the rebellion—in order to depose John from the English throne, were threatening Innocent’s plan for a crusade. Guala’s position as legate in England was especially influential since the Archbishop of Canterbury, Stephen Langton, was absent from the kingdom from September 1215 to May 1218, during which absence Guala Bicchieri, as papal legate, was practically in charge of the English church. As representing the pope, the suzerain of Henry, he claimed the regency and actually divided the chief power with William Marshal, 1st Earl of Pembroke.

Vincent (below) points out six areas in which Bicchieri made an impact upon England: establishing peace between the monarchy and rebels; overseeing Episcopal elections; supervising monastic houses; punishing and replacing rebel clergy;  judicial activity, including the appointment of legatine judges delegate; and implementing the legislation of the Fourth Lateran Council.

Guala was attacked in a long satirical poem by Gilles de Corbeil.

Guala’s role is of interest to students of English history: he supported John Lackland and then became the protector of John’s minor successor, Henry III; he punished English clerics who supported the French invader, Louis, and removed many of them from their positions. After the Treaty of Lambeth, he forced Louis to make a public and humiliating profession of penitence. He was also instrumental in convincing Pope Honorius III to grant an indulgence to the dean and chapter of Old Salisbury Cathedral permitting them to leave Old Sarum and start building New Salisbury Cathedral.

Guala Bicchieri returned to Italy in 1219 after the final defeat of the English rebel barons and the Treaty of Lambeth. Soon after his return to Italy, he founded the Abbey of St Andrew in Vercelli, his home town. It is named for—and its architecture was imitative of St Andrew's Church in Chesterton, Cambridge, which Bicchieri had been given for his services to the church during the difficult period of the civil war. In 1224, also in Vercelli, he founded Saint Andrew's hospital.

Of great interest to students of English literature is the fact that the premises of Vercelli Cathedral Museum hold the famed Vercelli Book, one of the few extant manuscripts of early English (Anglo-Saxon) writings.  Although there is still much debate as to how the manuscript wound up in Italy, at least some sources (discussed in Krapp, below) give credence to the theory that Guala Bicchieri brought it back with him when he returned from England. Bicchieri died in 1227 and is entombed in the Basilica di Sant'Andrea in Vercelli.

Sources

Notes

1150s births
1227 deaths
People from Vercelli
13th-century Italian cardinals
Bishops of Vercelli
Diplomats of the Holy See